Adrián Amir El Charani Trujillo (born 24 October 2000) is a Venezuelan footballer who plays as a forward for Atlético Venezuela.

Club career
El Charani made his debut for Carabobo on 14 April 2017, coming on as a substitute for Tommy Tobar in a 5–1 defeat to Zulia.

In February 2020, El Charani returned to Venezuela and joined Atlético Venezuela.

International career
El Charani was called up to the Venezuela under 17 side in late 2016 and played against the under 20 side.

Career statistics

Club
.

Notes

References

2000 births
Living people
Syrian footballers
Druze sportspeople
Syrian Druze
Venezuelan Druze
Venezuelan footballers
Venezuelan expatriate footballers
Venezuelan people of Syrian descent
Association football forwards
Carabobo F.C. players
Club Recreativo Granada players
Granada CF footballers
Atlético Venezuela C.F. players
Tercera División players
Venezuelan expatriate sportspeople in Spain
Expatriate footballers in Spain
CD Huétor Vega players